, is a stony near-Earth object and potentially hazardous asteroid on an eccentric orbit. It was discovered by American astronomers Eleanor Helin and Jeff Alu at the Palomar Observatory in California on 24 September 1992.

Classification and orbit 

The asteroid orbits the Sun at a distance of 0.8–1.7 AU once every 17 months (509 days). Its orbit has an eccentricity of 0.32 and an inclination of 15° with respect to the ecliptic. This makes the body a potentially hazardous asteroid, because its MOID is less than 0.05 AU and its diameter is greater than 150 meters. The first precovery was obtained at Palomar Observatory in 1953, extending the asteroid's observation arc by 39 years prior to its discovery.

Physical characteristics 

In the SMASS classification,  is characterized as a common stony S-type asteroid.

Rotation period 

Several rotational lightcurves form photometric observations have been obtained for this body. In 1999, Czech astronomer Petr Pravec constructed a lightcurve, that rendered a rotation period of  hours and a brightness variation of 0.72 in magnitude.

The rotation period of 1992 SK is slowly accelerating due to the YORP effect.

Diameter and albedo 

According to the surveys carried out by NASA's space-based Wide-field Infrared Survey Explorer with its subsequent NEOWISE mission, the asteroid measures 1.0 and 0.94 kilometers in diameter and its surface has an albedo of 0.28 to 0.32, respectively. The ExploreNEOs project finds an albedo of 0.34, with an diameter of 0.9 kilometers, and the Collaborative Asteroid Lightcurve Link calculates a diameter of 1.18 kilometers based on an assumed standard albedo for stony asteroids of 0.20 and an absolute magnitude of 17.0.

Numbering and naming 

This minor planet was numbered by the Minor Planet Center on 2 March 1999. , it has not been named.

Notes

References

External links 
 space.frieger.com – 3D Model of (10115) 1992 SK
 Asteroid Lightcurve Database (LCDB), query form (info )
 Dictionary of Minor Planet Names, Google books
 Asteroids and comets rotation curves, CdR – Observatoire de Genève, Raoul Behrend
 
 
 

010115
Discoveries by Eleanor F. Helin
Discoveries by Jeff T. Alu
010115
19920924